Jose Jason Llagas Chancoco is a multi-awarded contemporary Bicolano writer in Bikol, Iriganon, Filipino, and English languages.

His first book is Pagsasatubuanan: Poetikang Bikolnon launched in 2009.

References

External links
Habayon – his personal blog
Jose Jason Chancoco at Linangan sa Imahen, Retorika at Anyo (LIRA)

Year of birth missing (living people)
Living people
21st-century Filipino writers